2,4,5-Trihydroxymethamphetamine (THMA) is a neurotoxin and a metabolite of MDMA. It has structural similarity to the dopamine neurotoxin 6-hydroxydopamine, and produces lasting serotonin deficits when administered centrally.

See also
 2,4,5-Trihydroxyamphetamine

References

Methamphetamines
Recreational drug metabolites
Neurotoxins